Regina Glynn is a camogie player. She won camogie All Star awards in 2006, 2009 and 2010 played in the 2008 All Ireland final and 2009 All Ireland club final. She won a Senior All Ireland camogie final with Galway in 2013 & 2 Ashbourne College cups with the University of Limerick in 2005 & 2006.

References

External links
 Official Camogie Website
 Galway Camogie website
 of 2009 championship in On The Ball Official Camogie Magazine
 https://web.archive.org/web/20091228032101/http://www.rte.ie/sport/gaa/championship/gaa_fixtures_camogie_oduffycup.html Fixtures and results] for the 2009 O'Duffy Cup
 All-Ireland Senior Camogie Championship: Roll of Honour
 Video highlights from Galway's 2009 championship matches against Kilkenny and Wexford.
 Video highlights of 2009 championship Part One and part two
 Reports of 2008 All Ireland final in Independent, Irish Times Examiner, Reaction in Examiner
 Video highlights of 2008 championship Part One, Part Two and Part three
 Video of 2008 All Ireland finals preview
 Video of 2008 All Ireland semi-final Wexford v Galway

Year of birth missing (living people)
Living people
Galway camogie players
UL GAA camogie players